Steven J. Law is president and CEO of One Nation and American Crossroads, president of its sister organization CrossroadsGPS, and president of the Super PAC Senate Leadership Fund.  He previously held the position of Chief Legal Officer and General Counsel at the U.S. Chamber of Commerce. He served as Deputy Secretary of Labor in the administration of U.S. President George W. Bush. In 2005, Law chaired the President's Management Council Subcommittee on E-Government.

Law is a Phi Beta Kappa honors graduate of the University of California at Davis, and a graduate of Columbia Law School.

References

External links

Year of birth missing (living people)
Living people
University of California, Davis alumni
Columbia Law School alumni
George W. Bush administration personnel
United States Chamber of Commerce people
United States Deputy Secretaries of Labor